Thymiaterium or Thymiaterion was an ancient Carthaginian colony in present-day Morocco. The Periplus (Περίπλους) of Hanno the Navigator claims that he founded it on his journey of exploration beyond the Pillars of Hercules. The manuscript is a copy of another Greek work which translated the Punic original and is part of the Codex Palatines Graecus 398 which belongs to the Heidelberg University.

According to Hanno, he founded the colony, the first of his journey, two days' sail past the Pillars of Hercules. Schoff, citing Karl Müller, identified it with the town of Mehedia, currently known as Mehdya. The location of Thymiaterium is also given at Mehedia in the Atlas of Ancient & Classical Geography.  Hanno may have been deliberately vague about the location of colonies he founded to prevent enemies of Carthage from finding them.

References

Karl Müller, Geographi Græci Minores, vol. 1, Firmin-Didot, 1882

Phoenician colonies in Morocco
Ancient Morocco
Peripluses in Greek